The 2016–17 Xavier Musketeers men's basketball team represented Xavier University during the 2016–17 NCAA Division I men's basketball season. Led by eighth-year head coach Chris Mack, they played their games at the Cintas Center in Norwood, Ohio and were fourth-year members of the Big East Conference. They finished the season 24–14, 9–9 in Big East play to finish in seventh place. In the Big East tournament, they defeated DePaul and Butler before losing to Creighton in the semifinals. They received an at-large bid to the NCAA tournament as a No. 11 seed in the West region where they defeated Maryland, Florida State, and Arizona before losing in the Elite Eight to Gonzaga.

Previous season
The Musketeers finished the 2015–16 season 28–6, 14–4 in Big East play to finish in second place. They defeated Marquette in the quarterfinals of the Big East tournament to advance to the semifinals where they lost to Seton Hall. They received an at-large bid to the NCAA tournament where they received a No. 2 seed. They defeated Weber State in the First Round to advance to the Second Round where they lost to Wisconsin.

Preseason
Prior to the season, Xavier was picked to finish second in a poll of Big East coaches.  Trevon Bluiett and Edmond Sumner were selected to the preseason All-Big East first team.

Departures

Incoming transfers

Season summary

Preseason
Junior Trevon Bluiett entered his name in the NBA Pre-Draft, but withdrew his name prior to the deadline and will return to Xavier.

Incoming recruits

Future recruits

2017–18 team recruits

Roster

Schedule and results

|-
!colspan=9 style=""| Exhibition

|-
!colspan=9 style=""| Regular season

|-
!colspan=9 style=""|Big East tournament

|-
!colspan=9 style=""|NCAA tournament

Rankings

*AP does not release post-NCAA tournament rankings

References

Xavier Musketeers men's basketball seasons
Xavier
Xavier